The 2012–13 Real Valladolid season was the club's first season in La Liga since its relegation at the end of the 2009–10 season. The club's manager in the previous season, Miroslav Đukić, continued with the team.

Trophies balance

Competitive balance

Summer transfers

In

Out

Loan in

Loan out

Loan return

Promotion from youth system

Winter transfers

In

Promotion from youth system

Current squad

Squad 
Updated to 23 January 2013

Youth system

Long-term injuries

Víctor Pérez's broken fibula
Out between: January 2013 – May 2013
In the morning training of 5 January 2013, Víctor Pérez broke the fibula in his right leg fortuitously, and at the evening he underwent surgery in the Hospital Sagrado Corazón by Dr. Rafael Ramos, chief of Real Valladolid's medical service. The estimated time for recovery of his injury is about four months approximately, so he would miss the remainder of the season.

Called up by their national football team

Match statistics
Updated to 29 January 2013

Competitions

Pre-season and friendly tournaments

Friendly matches

15th Ramón Losada Trophy

Copa Castilla y León 2012

39th Ciudad de Valladolid Trophy

1st Canal de Castilla Trophy

La Liga

 Win   Draw   Lost

 La Liga Winner (also qualified for 2013–14 UEFA Champions League Group Stage)
 2013–14 UEFA Champions League Group Stage
 2013–14 UEFA Champions League 4th Qualifying Round
 2013–14 UEFA Europa League Group Stage
 2013–14 UEFA Europa League 4th Qualifying Round 
 2013–14 UEFA Europa League 3rd Qualifying Round
 Relegation to Liga Adelante

Matches

Copa del Rey

Round of 32

Notes

2012-13
Spanish football clubs 2012–13 season